Callistosporium is a genus of fungi in the order Agaricales. Basidiocarps (fruit bodies) are agarics (gilled mushrooms), either with a central stipe (stalk} or pleurotoid (with a lateral stipe). The latter group were formerly referred to Pleurocollybia. Recent molecular research, based on cladistic analysis of DNA sequences, has shown that the genus is a natural, monophyletic grouping, though not all species have yet been sequenced. Species are saprotrophic, typically growing on wood, and the genus is found worldwide.

Species
C. amazonicum
C. brunescens 
C. chrysophorum
C. elaeodes
C. elegans
C. foetens
C. galerinoides
C. heimii
C. hesleri
C. imbricatum
C. krambrukum
C. luteo-olivaceum
C. marginatum
C. palmarum
C. pinicola
C. praemultifolium
C. purpureomarginatum
C. terrigenum
C. vinosobrunneum
C. xerampelinum

References

Agaricales genera
Taxa named by Rolf Singer